Tobias Aagaard Hansen (born 10 March 2002) is a Danish road and track cyclist, who currently rides for UCI Continental team .

Career
He was part of the team that won the team pursuit at the 2021 UEC European Track Championships.

He joined his first full UCI Conti team in 2023, .

Major results

Track

2019
 2nd Scratch, National Championships
2020
 UEC European Junior Championships
1st  Elimination
2nd  Points
 2nd Madison (with Julius Johansen), National Championships
2021
 1st  Team pursuit, UEC European Championships
 National Championships
1st  Omnium
2nd Points
 2nd Team pursuit, UCI Nations Cup, Hong Kong
2022
 2nd  Team pursuit, UEC European Championships
 3rd  Team pursuit, UCI World Championships
 3rd Team pursuit, UCI Nations Cup, Glasgow

Road
2022
 1st Stage 3 Baltic Chain Tour

References

External links
 

2002 births
Living people
Danish track cyclists
Danish male cyclists
Sportspeople from Odense
21st-century Danish people